Green Dragon may refer to:

Chinese religion 
 Azure Dragon, also known as Green Dragon, one of the Dragon Kings of the Four Seas

Consumer products 
 Green dragon (tincture), a tincture derived from Cannabis

Buildings 
 The Green Dragon, a popular name for public houses in England and Wales
 The Green Dragon, Monmouth, a public house and inn located in St Thomas Square Monmouth, Wales
 The Green Dragon, Flaunden, a public house in Flaunden, Hertfordshire, England 
 Green Dragon Tavern, a meeting place during the era of the American Revolution in Boston, Massachusetts

Film 
 Green Dragon (film), a 2001 film by Timothy Linh Bui

Games 
 Green dragon (Dungeons & Dragons), a monster from the game Dungeons & Dragons
 Green dragon tile, a tile in the game of Mahjong / Mah Jongg

Literature 
 "The Green Serpent", a fairy tale
 The Green Dragon, an inn from J. R. R. Tolkien's Middle-earth writings
 At the Green Dragon, a.k.a. The Green Dragon, a novel by Joseph Jefferson Farjeon

Plants 
 Green dragon, the common name of several plants in the family Araceae, including:
 the North American species Arisaema dracontium
 the Asian genus Pinellia
 Green dragon, another name for the pitaya or dragon fruit

Ships 
 , a United States Navy patrol boat commissioned in 1917 which saw service during World War I

Songs 
 "The Green Dragon", a song from the soundtrack album and film Dogs in Space, performed by Michael Hutchence

Sailing 
 Green Dragon Racing Team, the joint Chinese-Irish entry in the 2008–2009 Volvo Ocean Race

UAV 
 IAI Green Dragon, an loitering munition developed by the Israel Aerospace Industries

Other 
 "Green Dragon," a nickname for the rocket fuel pentaborane
 Green Dragon (Lake Compounce), a wooden roller coaster located at Lake Compounce in Bristol, Connecticut
 The Green Dragon Crescent Blade, a legendary guandao said to have been wielded by Guan Yu
 The Peerless Green Dragon, a race car
 Green Dragon (order), a mystical Tibetan or Japanese occult order